Bill Shelton (3 August 1902 – 11 May 1995) was an Australian rules footballer who played with Melbourne in the Victorian Football League (VFL). He was the cousin of Jack Shelton.

Notes

External links 

 
Demonwiki profile

1902 births
Australian rules footballers from Victoria (Australia)
Melbourne Football Club players
1995 deaths
Brighton Football Club players